Manigiramam, or manigramam, typically refers to a medieval merchant guild, organised by itinerant ethnic Indian traders, primarily active in south India. Along with the ainurruvar (the Ayyavole Five Hundred) and the anjuvannam (the anjuman), the manigiramam played a major role in the commercial activities of the region. Unlike the anjuvannam which was confined to the port-towns of south India, the manigramam is found both in the port-towns and in the hinter-land trade centres.

A body of merchants known as "the Vaniggrama" or "Vaniyagrama" attest its presence in north India as early as first century BC.  They appear in a Karle inscription (first century BCE), a charter of king Vishnusena from Kathiawad (6th century CE) and in a Sanjeli charter of king Toramana (6th century CE).

Records of activities of manigramam in South India are visible from the 5th century CE. The first reference to manigiramam is found in two copper plate grants from south Karnataka (from Melekote, Tumkur and from Hassan district), both datable to the 5th century CE. The Melekote charter records a grant of land to a Buddhist shrine. The Quilon Syrian copper plates, of 9th century CE, also attests the presence of the manigiramam representatives. It seems that by the 9th century the manigramam had become interested in ocean trade too and collaborated with the anjuvannam (the anjuman) on the western coast. A Tamil inscription from Takua Pa (9th century CE) in Thailand refers to a manigiramam guild.

From the early 10th century the ainurruvar (the Ayyavole Five Hundred) expanded as the superior guild of merchants of south India. The manigiramam and anjuvannam were incorporated later into the ainurruvar. The ainurruvar, in and after the 12th century CE, acted as an "umbrella organization" to cover all other merchant guilds.

See also
Ainurruvar (the Ayyavole Five Hundred)
Anjuvannam (the Anjuman)

References 

Society of India
Guilds in India
Economic history of India
Indian merchants